USS Hubbard (DE-211/APD-53) was a  in service with the United States Navy from 1944 to 1946. She was scrapped in 1966.

History
Hubbard was named in honor of Commander Joseph C. Hubbard (1900–1942), who was killed in action, while serving aboard the heavy cruiser  during the Naval Battle of Guadalcanal on 13 November 1942. She was launched by the Charleston Navy Yard on 11 November 1943; sponsored by Mrs. Helen L. Hubbard, widow of Commander Hubbard; and commissioned on 6 March 1944.

Following shakedown training out of Bermuda, the new destroyer escort returned to Norfolk, Virginia on 7 May 1944. She then escorted the oiler  to the Caribbean, returning to Norfolk on 23 May for armament changes. Armed with 40 mm guns in lieu of torpedo tubes, Hubbard sailed with her first convoy on 1 June, seeing the transports safely to Bizerte, Tunisia and returning to New York on 19 July 1944. She subsequently made two more convoy crossings in 1944, and underwent anti-submarine training at Casco Bay, Maine, between voyages.

Hubbard sailed on 26 December 1944 with other destroyer escorts to hunt down weather-reporting U-boats in the Atlantic. Equipped with the latest direction-finding gear, the ships scouted the suspected area until they came upon  on 16 January 1945. Depth charge attacks sank the German marauder late that morning. The ships arrived New York on 6 February and, after additional training in Casco Bay, sailed again to search for submarines 4 April from NS Argentia, Newfoundland. After many depth charge attacks, four by Hubbard alone,  surfaced. The destroyer escorts' guns quickly sank the submarine.

Hubbard returned to Boston on 10 May 1945 and began her conversion to a Charles Lawrence-class high speed transport, suitable for the still-active Pacific War. She was reclassified APD-53 on 1 June 1945 and emerged from Sullivans Dry Dock, Brooklyn, on 14 August, the day before the surrender of Japan.

Following three months of training operations in the Caribbean and Casco Bay, Hubbard arrived Green Cove Springs, Florida, on 12 November 1945. She decommissioned on 15 March 1946 and entered the Reserve Fleet, where she remained being struck from the Navy List on 1 May 1966 and scrapped.

Awards 
Hubbard received two battle stars for World War II service.

References

External links

 

 

Buckley-class destroyer escorts
Charles Lawrence-class high speed transports
Ships built in Charleston, South Carolina
World War II frigates and destroyer escorts of the United States
World War II amphibious warfare vessels of the United States
1943 ships